Early New High German literature refers to literature written in German between the middle of the 14th century and the middle of the 17th. The term Early Modern German literature is also used to cover all or part of the same period.

The fundamental development from Middle High German literature was

Key authors and works

Authors
 Götz von Berlichingen
 Ulrich Boner
 Sebastian Brant
 Johann Fischart
 Hans Folz
 Ulrich Füetrer
 Sebastian Franck 
 Andreas Gryphius
 Ulrich von Hutten
 Heinrich Kaufringer
 Daniel Casper von Lohenstein
 Martin Luther
 Martin Opitz
 Hans Rosenplüt
 Hans Sachs
 Johannes von Tepl
 Georg Wickram
 Heinrich Wittenwiler
 Oswald von Wolkenstein
 Niklas von Wyle

Anonymous works
 Dukus Horant
 Fortunatus
 Historia von D. Johann Fausten
 Lied vom Hürnen Seyfrid
 Till Eulenspiegel
 Tristrant und Isalde

See also
Early New High German
German Renaissance
Humanism in Germany
Protestant Reformation

Notes

Sources
  With a selection of texts.

 With a selection of texts.

External links
 Early New High German texts (German Wikisource)
 Luther's translation of the New Testament (German Wikisource)

German literature
German literature of the Late Middle Ages
Literature of the German Renaissance